Bishop Fidelis Rakotonarivo (born 28 August 1956 in Ambohimahazo) is the head of the Diocese of Ambositra in Ambositra, Madagascar. He was ordained priest on 15 August 1992 by the Society of Jesus. He was appointed and confirmed as bishop during 2004.

External links

 Profile of Bishop Rakotonarivo

1956 births
Living people
People from Amoron'i Mania
21st-century Roman Catholic bishops in Madagascar
Malagasy Jesuits
Jesuit bishops
Roman Catholic bishops of Ambositra
Malagasy Roman Catholic bishops